Dabe is a Papuan language of Indonesia. It is spoken in Dabe village, Pantai Timur subdistrict, Sarmi Regency.

References

Languages of western New Guinea
Orya–Tor languages